An Innocent Adventuress is a lost 1919 American silent comedy film directed by Robert G. Vignola and written by Clara Genevieve Kennedy. The film stars Vivian Martin, Lloyd Hughes, Edythe Chapman, Gertrude Norman, Jane Wolfe, and Tom Bates. The film was released on June 8, 1919, by Paramount Pictures.

Plot
As described in a film magazine, because her wealthy aunt and guardian Heppy (Chapment) is about to evict a poor family that lives on the estate, Lindy (Martin) destroys the letter which she believes demands that they vacate the premises. A robbery is committed in the neighborhood and Dick Ross (Hughes), a reformed crook who has been in Aunt Heppy's services, believes Lindy is in league with the crooks. Lindy thinks that he knows of her fancied crime and half confesses to him. To shield her he is about to confess to the crime when the tramp who is guilty and who had been fed and clothed by the generous Lindy clears up the mystery concerning the robbery. Lindy then tells him of the letter, and he informs her that it was not so important a document as she had imagined, and that she is not in danger of arrest. They then plight their troth.

Cast
Vivian Martin as Lindy
Lloyd Hughes as Dick Ross
Edythe Chapman as Aunt Heppy
Gertrude Norman as Mrs. Cribbley
Jane Wolfe as Mrs. Bates 
Tom Bates as Chilowee Bill 
Hal Clements as Doc Brogan
Jim Farley as Brogan's Accomplice
Spottiswoode Aitken as Meekton

References

External links 

 

1919 films
1910s English-language films
Silent American comedy films
1919 comedy films
Paramount Pictures films
Films directed by Robert G. Vignola
Lost American films
American black-and-white films
American silent feature films
Lost comedy films
1919 lost films
1910s American films